Culley Run (also known as Cully Run or Colley Run) is a tributary of Fishing Creek in Columbia County, Pennsylvania, in the United States. Shale, sandstone, alluvium, and glacial till can be found in the watershed. At least one bridge crosses the stream. The stream is most likely named after Alexander Colley, Sr.

Course

Culley Run begins in a valley in Benton Township between Steinbuck Road and Cully Run Road. It flows southeast for several hundred feet, alongside Cully Run Road. It then turns east for a short distance and then turns south, still following the road. After a few tenths of a mile, the stream crosses Pennsylvania Route 254 and turns east-southeast for several tenths of a mile, flowing alongside Pennsylvania Route 254. After several tenths of a mile, it crosses Pennsylvania Route 254 again. Several hundred feet further downstream, it reaches its confluence with Fishing Creek, not far from the community of Maple Grove.

Geography, geology, and watershed

The Pennsylvania Department of Transportation also has a permit to maintain a box culvert made of reinforced concrete on the stream.

Culley Run flows over alluvium in its lower reaches. This alluvium contains stratified sand, silt, gravel, and some boulders. Colluvium can also be found in the vicinity of the stream's lower reaches. It contains shale and sandstone pieces of various sizes. A glacial till known as the Illinoian Till can be found in the upper reaches of the stream's watershed. Bedrock containing red and gray sandstone and shale also occurs in the watershed.

There is a bridge carrying Pennsylvania Route 254 over the stream. The bridge was repaired at one point for a cost of $104,000.

The stream is entirely in the United States Geological Survey quadrangle of Benton.

History and etymology
Culley Run was entered into the Geographic Names Information System on August 2, 1979. Its identifier in the Geographic Names Information System is 1172817.

In 2004, the Columbia County Natural Areas Inventory recommended protecting Culley Run.

Culley Run is also known as Colley Run. Walter M. Brasch asserts in his 1982 book Columbia County Place Names that Colley Run is the correct name of the stream, although it is officially known as Culley Run. Brasch states that the stream is most likely named after Alexander Colley, Sr., a surveyor and teacher who served on the Pennsylvania legislature from 1822 to 1823.

See also
Karnes Hollow, next tributary of Fishing Creek going downstream
West Creek (Pennsylvania), next tributary of Fishing Creek going upstream
List of tributaries of Fishing Creek (North Branch Susquehanna River)
List of rivers of Pennsylvania

References

Rivers of Columbia County, Pennsylvania
Tributaries of Fishing Creek (North Branch Susquehanna River)
Rivers of Pennsylvania